Scruggs is a surname, typically of Americans, but also documented in the United Kingdom, several of its other former colonies British descent is especially common, Germany, and (the country of) Georgia.

Charles Scruggs of Bone Thugs-n-Harmony, American hip hop band from Cleveland, Ohio
Chris Scruggs (born 1982), American singer-songwriter
Earl Scruggs (1924–2012), American musician who perfected and popularized a 3-finger banjo-picking style (now called Scruggs style)
Scruggs style, the most common style of playing the banjo in bluegrass music
Edward W. Scruggs (1903-1974), American politician
Elaine Scruggs (Non-Partisan), mayor of Glendale, Arizona
Flatt & Scruggs or the Foggy Mountain Boys, bluegrass band founded by Lester Flatt and Earl Scruggs
Greg Scruggs (born 1990), American football player
Irene Scruggs (1901–1981), American Piedmont blues and country blues singer, who was also billed as Chocolate Brown and Dixie Nolan
Jan Scruggs (born 1950), American lawyer
Joe Scruggs (born 1951), American children's music performer
Joe E. Scruggs, second head football coach for the Tennessee State University Tigers located in Nashville, Tennessee
Joseph Scruggs (1888-1964), provincial politician from Alberta, Canada
Lauren Scruggs (born 1988), American blogger
Lawson A. Scruggs (1857-1914), American physician
Louise Scruggs (1927-2006), American music manager 
Lucie Johnson Scruggs (1864-1892), African-American writer
Mary Elfrieda Scruggs or Mary Lou Williams (1910–1981), American jazz pianist, composer, and arranger
Paul Scruggs (born 1998), American basketball player
Randy Scruggs (1953–2018), American music producer, songwriter and guitarist
Richard Scruggs (born 1946), American former A6A naval aviator, a prominent trial lawyer, one of the richest men in Mississippi
Rick Scruggs (born 1955), American basketball coach
Ted Scruggs (1923-2000), American football player
Tony Scruggs (born 1966), former Major League Baseball left fielder
Uncle John Scruggs (1855-1941), African-American banjo player
William Lindsay Scruggs (1836–1912), American author, lawyer, and diplomat
Xavier Scruggs (born 1987), African-American baseball player

Scruggs (film) a 1965 British film with Susannah York

See also
Creggs
The Ballad of Buster Scruggs (2018 film)
Krug (disambiguation)
Scrag (disambiguation)
Scroggs (disambiguation)